Zsolt Patvaros (born 18 February 1993) is a Hungarian football player.

Club statistics

Updated to games played as of 19 May 2019.

References 
HLSZ

1993 births
Living people
People from Kecskemét
Hungarian footballers
Hungary youth international footballers
Hungary under-21 international footballers
Association football midfielders
Kecskeméti TE players
Zalaegerszegi TE players
Balmazújvárosi FC players
Nyíregyháza Spartacus FC players
Nemzeti Bajnokság I players
Nemzeti Bajnokság II players
Sportspeople from Bács-Kiskun County